Lawrence Davidson is a retired professor of history from West Chester University in West Chester, Pennsylvania. He is the author of Islamic Fundamentalism, Cultural Genocide and has focused his academic research on American foreign relations with the Middle East.

Early life and education 
Davidson was born to a secular Jewish household in Philadelphia, Pennsylvania in 1945. He attended Rutgers University from 1963 to 1967, where he earned a bachelor's degree in history. While attending Rutgers, Davidson developed a leftist perspective regarding the problems facing the US in the 1960s.

In 1967, Davidson was accepted into Georgetown University Master's program where he studied modern European intellectual history under Palestinian expatriate professor Hisham Sharabi. During his time at Georgetown (1969–1970), Davidson became one of the founding members of the Students for a Democratic Society (SDS) at Georgetown at the height of the Vietnam War.

In 1970, with the breakup of the SDS, Davidson left the United States for Canada. He spent the next six years at the University of Alberta in Edmonton where he earned a PhD (1976) in modern European Intellectual history.

After returning to the United States in the mid-1970s, Davidson spent several years as an adjunct instructor at various colleges and universities, as well as working for a time as a middle manager at Alexian Brothers Health Systems Catholic hospital in St. Louis.  Subsequently, he was contracted to write the history of Alexian Brothers’ oldest hospital. This led to his first book, The Alexian Brothers of Chicago (1990).

In 1989, Davidson joined the faculty of history at West Chester University as a tenure track professor where he taught Middle East history, the history of science, and modern European intellectual history.  He retired from WCU in May 2013.

Currently, Davidson writes for his Blog To The Point Analyses and is a contributing editor for Logos: A Journal of Modern Society and Culture. Davidson is a board member of the U.S. Campaign for the Academic and Cultural Boycott of Israel.

Cultural Genocide (2012) 
In 2012, Rutgers University Press published Davidson's book Cultural Genocide. Davidson defines cultural genocide as the "purposeful destructive targeting of out-group cultures so as to destroy or weaken them in the process of conquest or domination".

Books 
 Davidson, Lawrence. The Alexian Brothers of Chicago: An Evolutionary Look at the Monastery and Modern Health Care. New York: Vantage Press, 1990.
 Davidson, Lawrence. Islamic Fundamentalism. Westport, CT: Greenwood, 1998.
 Davidson, Lawrence. America's Palestine: Popular and Official Perceptions from Balfour to Israeli Statehood. Gainesville, FL: U of Florida, 2001.
 Davidson, Lawrence. Foreign Policy, Inc.: Privatizing America's National Interest. Lexington: U of Kentucky, 2009.
 Goldschmidt, Arthur, Lawrence Davidson, and Tom Weiner. A Concise History of the Middle East. Boulder, CO. : Westview Press, 2002.
 Davidson, Lawrence. Cultural Genocide. New Brunswick, NJ: Rutgers UP, 2012.

References

External links 
 To The Point Analyses
 Consortium News
 Logos Journal
with Larry Davidson by Stephen McKiernan, Binghamton University Libraries Center for the Study of the 1960s

1945 births
Living people
American male non-fiction writers
American political writers
Genocide
Georgetown University Graduate School of Arts and Sciences alumni
Historians of the Middle East
Islam and politics
Middle Eastern studies in the United States
Rutgers University alumni
University of Alberta alumni
West Chester University faculty